Ferny Hills is a suburb in the Moreton Bay Region, Queensland, Australia.

Geography
Ferny Hills is north-west of Brisbane, the state capital, and is located along Samford Road. Informally it is part of the Hills District. 

The western part of the suburb is within the Samford Conservation Park. The eastern part of the suburb is residential.

History 
Ferny Hills is situated in the Yugarabul traditional Indigenous Australian country.

Ferny Way State School opened on 27 January 1970. In 1973 it was renamed Ferny Hills State School. 

Patricks Road State School opened on 24 January 1977.

Until 2006, a notable feature of Ferny Hills was the Australian Woolshed, which was an Australian farming and wildlife attraction featuring shows and animal exhibits. This has since been demolished and a residential development has been built called 'Woolshed Grove' paying homage to its previous life. The Australian Woolshed was also featured as a setting in Episode 12, Season 4 of The Amazing Race. 

The median age of the Ferny Hills population was 36 years, 1 year below the national median of 37. 82.6% of people living in Ferny Hills were born in Australia. The other top responses for country of birth were England 4.4%, New Zealand 3.6%, South Africa 0.8%, Scotland 0.6%, India 0.4%. 94.3% of people spoke only English at home; the next most common languages were 0.5% Italian, 0.3% German, 0.2% Polish, 0.2% Spanish, 0.2% Mandarin.

Education 
Ferny Hills State School is a government primary (Prep-6) school for boys and girls at Illuta Avenue. In 2018, the school had an enrolment of 343 students with 31 teachers (25 full-time equivalent) and 23 non-teaching staff (14 full-time equivalent). It includes a special education program.

Patricks Road State School is a government primary (Prep-6) school for boys and girls at Patricks Road. In 2018, the school had an enrolment of 789 students with 56 teachers (49 full-time equivalent) and 28 non-teaching staff (19 full-time equivalent).  It includes a special education program.

There is no secondary school in Ferny Hills. The nearest government secondary school is Ferny Grove State High School in neighbouring Ferny Grove to the south.

Amenities 
There are convenience centres located on Ferny Way on the southern end of the suburb.

References

External links

 

Suburbs of Moreton Bay Region